anybody's game is the fourth single by the Japanese singer and songwriter Miho Komatsu released under Amemura O-Town Record label. It was released on 14 March 1998. The single reached #9 on the charts in its first week and sold 35,440 copies. It charted for eight weeks and sold 98,990 copies

Track listing
All songs are written and composed by Miho Komatsu and arranged by Hirohito Furui
"anybody's game"

'"anybody's game" (instrumental)
 (instrumental)

Use in media
"anybody's game"
Fuji TV program SF as ending theme
NHK drama series Ojisan Kaizou Kouza as theme song
KBS music program J-rock Artists Best 50 as opening theme

"Ichiman Meter no Keshiki"
Yomiuri TV program Japan International Birdman Rallyas theme song
Shizuoka Asahi Television informational program Sport Paradise as ending theme
CM song for Iwaki Meisei University's radio

References 

1998 singles
Miho Komatsu songs
Songs written by Miho Komatsu
1998 songs
Being Inc. singles
Amemura-O-Town Record singles
Song recordings produced by Daiko Nagato